The Aṭṭhakavagga (Pali, "Octet Chapter") and the Pārāyanavagga (Pali, "Way to the Far Shore Chapter") are two small collections of suttas within the Pāli Canon of Theravada Buddhism. They are among the earliest existing Buddhist literature, and place considerable emphasis on the rejection of, or non-attachment to, all views.

Textual concerns

Position within the Sutta Pitaka
The  and the Pārāyanavagga are two small collections of suttas. They are incorporated in the Khuddhaka Nikāya as subdivisions of the Sutta Nipāta, the collection of the words spoken by the Buddha. The suttas portray the Aṭṭhakavagga as some of the Buddha's first sermons; the Udana depicts the Buddha asking a monk to recite Dhamma, and responding approvingly when he recites the Aṭṭhakavagga.

Dating
They are regarded as earlier because of elements of language and composition, their inclusion in very early commentaries, and also because some have seen them as expressing versions of certain Buddhist beliefs that are different from, and perhaps prior to, their later codified versions. The Khaggavisānasutta (Rhinoceros Sutra), also in the Sutta Nipāta, similarly seems to reveal an earlier mode of Buddhist monasticism, which emphasized individual wandering monastics, more in keeping with the Indian sannyāsin tradition.

In 1994, a group of texts which are among the earliest Indian manuscripts discovered were found in Gandhara.

Interpretations
The Atthakavagga does not give a clear-cut goal such as nirvana, but describes the ideal person. This ideal person is especially characterized by suddhi (purity) and santi (calmness). The  also places considerable emphasis on the rejection of, or non-attachment to, all views, and is reluctant to put forward positions of their own regarding basic metaphysical issues.

Pre-Buddhist or proto-Madhyamaka
Gomez compared them to later Madhyamaka philosophy, which in its  form especially makes a method of rejecting others' views rather than proposing its own.

Interpretation as heterodox
Tillman Vetter, although agreeing overall with Gomez's observations, suggests some refinements on historical and doctrinal grounds. First, he notes that neither of these short collections of suttas are homogeneous and hence are not all amenable to Gomez' proposals. According to Vetter, those suttas which do lend support to Gomez probably originated with a heterodox ascetic group that pre-dated the Buddha, and were integrated into the Buddhist Sangha at an early date, bringing with them some suttas that were already in existence and also composing further suttas in which they tried to combine their own teachings with those of the Buddha.

Interpretation as orthodox
Paul Fuller has rejected the arguments of Gomez and Vetter. He finds that 

Fuller states that in the Nikayas, right-view includes non-dependence on knowledge and views, and mentions the Buddha's simile of his dhamma as a raft that must be abandoned. He finds that the Atthakavagga's treatment of knowledge and wisdom is parallel to the later Patthana's apparent criticism of giving, holding the precepts, the duty of observance, and practicing the jhanas. In his view, both texts exhibit this particular approach not as an attack on practice or knowledge, but to point out that attachment to the path is destructive. Similarly, the text's treatment of concentration meditation is intended to warn against attachment to insight, and communicate that insight into the nature of things necessarily involves a calm mind.

Alexander Wynne also rejects both of Vetter's claims that the Parayanavagga shows a chronological stratification, and a different attitude toward mindfulness and liberating insight than do other works.

Theravada interpretation
The Theravada tradition has taken the view that the text's statements, including many which are clearly intended to be paradoxical, are meant to be puzzled over and explicated. An extended commentary attributed to Sariputta, entitled the Mahaniddesa, was included in the Canon. It seeks to reconcile the content of the poems with the teachings in the rest of the discourses. In some cases, the Theravada commentaries blunt or negate the rejection of all views by suggestion that the views being rejected are non-Buddhist views, while affirming the necessity of the views of the Eightfold Path.

See also
Presectarian Buddhism
Early Buddhist schools
Early Buddhist Texts
Pāli Canon
Sutta Piṭaka
Khuddaka Nikāya
Niddesa
Gandhāran Buddhist texts
Timeline of Buddhism
Similarities between Pyrrhonism and Buddhism

Notes

References

Sources

Printed sources

Web-sources

Further reading

External links

Translations
:
Translation by Paññobhāsa Bhikkhu (1999)
Translation by Paññobhāsa Bhikkhu (2012)
Translation by Thanissaro Bhikkhu (1997)
Translation by Bhikkhu Varado (2005)
Translation by V. Fausböll (1881)

Translation by Thanissaro Bhikkhu (1997)
Translation by V. Fausböll (1881)

Rhinoceros Sutra:
Translation by Thanissaro Bhikkhu (1997)
Translation by V. Fausböll (1881)

Commentaries
Commentary / introduction to Atthakavagga by Thanissaro Bhikkhu
Commentary / introduction to Parayanavagga by Thanissaro Bhikkhu
"Introduction to the Sutta Nipata" (1881) by V. Fausböll
Proto-Madhyamaka in the Pali Canon

Early Buddhist texts
Khuddaka Nikaya
Madhyamaka